Ryan Newman may refer to:

 Ryan Newman (racing driver) (born 1977), American stock car racing driver
 Ryan Newman (actress) (born 1998), American actress, singer, and model
 Ryan Dean Newman, American lawyer and former Army captain